Mario G. Racco (born May 13, 1955) is a politician in Ontario, Canada currently serving as a Local and Regional Councillor in the City of Vaughan since November 15, 2022. He was an Ontario Liberal Party member of the Legislative Assembly of Ontario from 2003 to 2007 who represented the Greater Toronto Area riding of Thornhill.

Background
Racco has degrees in Business Administration from Ryerson Polytechnical Institute (1977) and York University. He also received a Bachelor of Arts degree from York University in 1981. Racco practiced as a Chartered Accountant, for the firms of Thorne Riddell and Dunwoody Chartered Accountants. Racco is not a Chartered Accountant nor a Chartered Professional Accountant according to the CPA Ontario member directory.

In 2013, ‘Racco Parkway’ in Thornhill was named after him for his dedication and public service to the city.

He is married to Sandra Yeung Racco, a former city councillor in the city of Vaughan for Ward 4 (formerly held by her husband for 6 terms). They have two children, Alexander and Katrina.

Politics
Racco was elected to the city council of Vaughan, Ontario in 1982, and retained this position until his election to the Ontario legislature.

He ran for the federal Liberal nomination in Markham—Whitchurch—Stouffville in 1993, but lost to Jag Bhaduria.

In the 2003 provincial election, Racco defeated Susan Kadis for the Liberal nomination in Thornhill and ran against Tina Molinari, an incumbent from the Progressive Conservatives. Denominational education was a leading issue in this campaign, with Molinari supporting the extension of tax credits for religious education and Racco opposing it; some members of Thornhill's Orthodox Jewish community supported Molinari because of this issue. Racco eventually won by 796 votes. On March 6, 2006, he was appointed as Parliamentary Assistant to the Minister of Labour.

Racco was a leading supporter of allowing municipalities to use red light camera technology for safety purposes. In 2004, he was the driving force behind the construction of a new statue of Pierre Trudeau in Vaughan.

During the provincial election of 2007, Racco was defeated by Progressive Conservative candidate Peter Shurman. In one of the most hotly contested races in the province, Shurman came out with about 1500 votes more than Racco.

In a 2013 by-election and the 2014 Ontario general election, Racco's wife, Sandra Yeung Racco ran for the Ontario Liberal Party in Thornhill but was defeated both times by Gila Martow.

Return to Politics

On October 24, 2022 Racco was elected as one of four Local and Regional Councillors in the City of Vaughan.

Electoral Record

Four to be elected.

References

External links 
 

1955 births
Canadian accountants
Living people
Ontario Liberal Party MPPs
Toronto Metropolitan University alumni
York University alumni
21st-century Canadian politicians